UFC Fight Night: Poirier vs. Pettis (also known as UFC Fight Night 120) was a mixed martial arts event produced by the Ultimate Fighting Championship held on November 11, 2017, at Ted Constant Convocation Center in Norfolk, Virginia.

Background
The event marked the first time that the promotion visited the Hampton Roads area of Virginia.

A lightweight bout between Dustin Poirier and former WEC and UFC Lightweight Champion Anthony Pettis served as the event headliner.

A light heavyweight bout between Jared Cannonier and Antônio Rogério Nogueira was briefly linked to serve as the co-headliner at this event. The fight was rescheduled to take place a month later at UFC on Fox: Lawler vs. dos Anjos. 

At the weigh ins, Matthew Lopez weighed in at 138.5 pounds, 2.5 pounds over the bantamweight upper limit of 136 pounds. The bout proceeded at a catchweight and Lopez forfeited 20% of his purse to Raphael Assunção.

Results

Bonus awards
The following fighters were awarded $50,000 bonuses:
Fight of the Night: Dustin Poirier vs. Anthony Pettis  
Performance of the Night: Matt Brown and Raphael Assunção

Reported payout
The following is the reported payout to the fighters as reported to the Virginia Department of Professional & Occupational Regulation. It does not include sponsor money or "locker room" bonuses often given by the UFC and also do not include the UFC's traditional "fight night" bonuses. The total disclosed payout for the event was $1,935,600.

Dustin Poirier: $130,000 ($65,000 win bonus) def. Anthony Pettis: $135,000
Matt Brown: $150,000 ($75,000 win bonus) def. Diego Sanchez: $95,000
Andrei Arlovski: $250,000 (no win bonus) def. Júnior Albini: $12,000
Cezar Ferreira: $78,000 ($39,000 win bonus) def. Nate Marquardt: $68,000
Raphael Assunção: $113,600 ($55,000 win bonus) def. Matthew Lopez: $26,400 ^
Clay Guida: $114,000 ($57,000 win bonus) def. Joe Lauzon: $62,000
Marlon Moraes: $140,000 ($70,000 win bonus) def. John Dodson: $41,000
Tatiana Suarez: $50,000 ($25,000 win bonus) def. Viviane Pereira: $14,000
Sage Northcutt: $120,000 ($60,000 win bonus) def. Michel Quiñones: $10,000
Nina Ansaroff: $36,000 ($18,000 win bonus) def. Angela Hill: $21,000
Sean Strickland: $64,000 ($32,000 win bonus) def. Court McGee: $35,000
Jake Collier: $36,000 ($18,000 win bonus) def. Marcel Fortuna: $14,000
Karl Roberson: $20,000 ($10,000 win bonus) def. Darren Stewart: $10,000

^ Although not included on the initial report, Matthew Lopez was fined 20 percent of his purse ($3,600) for failing to make the required weight for his fight with Raphael Assunção. That money was issued to Assunção, a VDPOR official confirmed.

See also
List of UFC events
2017 in UFC

References

UFC Fight Night
2017 in mixed martial arts
2017 in sports in Virginia
Mixed martial arts in Virginia
Sports in Norfolk, Virginia
Events in Norfolk, Virginia
November 2017 sports events in the United States